Matías Emanuel Segovia Torales (born 4 January 2003) is a Paraguayan footballer who plays as a midfielder for Club Guaraní.

Career statistics

Club

Notes

References

2003 births
Living people
Association football midfielders
Paraguayan footballers
Paraguay youth international footballers
Paraguayan Primera División players
Club Guaraní players